Alaska Measure 2 or the Alaska Marijuana Criminalization Initiative was a successful 1990 ballot measure in the U.S. state of Alaska; the initiative stated that it: "would change Alaska's laws by making all such possession of marijuana criminal, with possible penalties of up to 90 days in jail and/or up to a $1000 fine."

The legal status of cannabis in Alaska has varied greatly since the passage in 1972 of a constitutional amendment affirming an individual's right to privacy. Alaska had previously recognized that right to privacy with respect to possession and use of cannabis with the 1975 Ravin v. State case in the Alaska Supreme Court. The state legislature then decriminalized marijuana in 1982.  The measure's passage in 1990 met with a variety of court challenges over the years before being struck down in 2003 by the Alaska Court of Appeals in Noy v. State.  Reversing the decision of this measure, Alaska voters ultimately legalized marijuana with a different Measure 2 in 2014.

Results

Campaign
The leader of the initiative campaign Alaskans for the Recriminalization of Marijuana was Marie Majewske, described as an "Anchorage grandmother". The initiative also received support from William Bennett, President Bush's Drug Czar, who planned to visit Alaska to campaign for the measure; the DEA and FBI also sponsored a Marijuana Myths and Misconceptions symposium in Anchorage.

Opposition to the initiative was led by Alaskans for Privacy, and the National Organization for the Reform of Marijuana Laws (NORML) gave top priority to defeating the initiative, contributing "nearly $16,000" to opposition efforts by late September.

Polling across Alaska in August of that year showed a nearly 2–1 margin of support for the measure. Gubernatorial candidates Arliss Sturgulewski (Republican) and Walter Hickel (Alaskan Independence Party) supported the initiative, while Democrat Tony Knowles supported criminalization but not incarceration for first-time offenders.

At the successful end of the campaign, Majewske announced:
It's wonderful, I have great faith in the people of this state. I truly believed they would do the right thing. I think that this will say to people that the law didn't work, and we need to be looking in the other direction, toward a drug-free environment for our children. The only way to do that is to tell them it's illegal.

References

External links

Alaska Marijuana Criminalization Initiative, Measure 2 (1990) at Ballotpedia

Cannabis ballot measures in the United States
Cannabis law in Alaska
1990 in cannabis
Cannabis prohibition
1990 Alaska elections
1990 ballot measures
Alaska ballot measures